Live in London is a live album by the band Sheer Greed.

Track listing
"First To Admit"
"War Baby"
"Everybody Wants"
"My Number" (Girl cover)
"Blue Favours"
"No Way Out"
"No Fun"
"Rita's Dirty Hideaway"
"Money and the Magic"
"Burn It Down"
"Hollywood Tease" (Girl cover)

Sheer Greed (band) albums
1993 live albums